Nordhausen station is a railway junction in the north of the German state of Thuringia and the main station in the city of Nordhausen. It is located just south of the city centre in the valley of the Zorge.

History
The railway arrived in Nordhausen on 10 July 1866 with the opening of the line to Halle, which was extended on 9 July 1867 to the west to Eichenberg. In 1869 lines to Northeim and to Erfurt were added. In 1897, the narrow gauge Harz Railway was opened to Wernigerode, starting at the Nordhausen Nord station on the north side of the station. In the station forecourt there is a stop on the Nordhausen tramway that connects the station with most districts of the town.

In 1994 the station was electrified. The station is also important for east-west freight and a large freight yard is located east of the station.

Rail services

References

External links

Railway stations in Thuringia
Nordhausen, Thuringia
Buildings and structures in Nordhausen (district)
Railway stations in Germany opened in 1866
1866 establishments in Prussia